The  is a limited express train service in Japan operated by West Japan Railway Company (JR West) which runs between  and .

Stops

Trains stop at the following stations:

 -  -  -  -  -  -

Rolling stock

Super Inaba
Kiha 187-500 series DMUs (since October 2003)

Inaba
KiHa 181 series DMUs (November 1997 - September 2003)

Formation
Only Standard class available
No smoking accommodation

Super Inaba

← Okayama/Tottori,    Kamigōri →

History
In October 2003, the KiHa 181 series DMUs operating on the former Inaba service were replaced by new KiHa 187 series trains, and the service was upgraded to become the Super Inaba.

External links
 Super Inaba KiHa 187 series 

Named passenger trains of Japan
West Japan Railway Company
Chizu Express
Railway services introduced in 2003